Justin Plaschka (born 12 August 1996) is a Jamaican swimmer. He competed in the men's 50 metre butterfly event at the 2017 World Aquatics Championships.

References

1996 births
Living people
Jamaican male swimmers
Place of birth missing (living people)
Male butterfly swimmers